Japhet Uutoni (also spelled Jafet Uutoni; born 29 June 1979) is a Namibian professional boxer in the light flyweight division. He was the 2005 Namibian sportsperson of the year in the Namibian newspaper and won a gold medal at the 2006 Commonwealth Games by defeating England's Darren Langley on points (37-24). He also won a silver medal at the 2010 Commonwealth Games.

Uutoni competes at the 48 kg weightclass and qualified for the 2008 Summer Olympics by beating Manyo Plange. He was a member of the team that competed for Africa at the 2005 Boxing World Cup in Moscow, Russia.

Professional boxing record

Sources

 Results of 2006 Commonwealth Games - Boxing, 48 Kg
 Japhet Uutoni at the African People Database
 
 Namibian Sport Year in Review, 22 December 2006, Namibian.com.na (see sports section)

External links
 Qualifier
 

1979 births
Living people
Sportspeople from Windhoek
Olympic boxers of Namibia
Boxers at the 2008 Summer Olympics
Boxers at the 2006 Commonwealth Games
Boxers at the 2010 Commonwealth Games
Commonwealth Games gold medallists for Namibia
Commonwealth Games silver medallists for Namibia
Place of birth missing (living people)
Namibian male boxers
Commonwealth Games medallists in boxing
Light-flyweight boxers
20th-century Namibian people
21st-century Namibian people
Medallists at the 2006 Commonwealth Games